Alejandro Posada Gómez (born in Bogotá 1960) is a Colombian conductor.

Education
Posada studied in Colombia and Austria.

Career
In 1992 Posada won second prize at the Cadaqués Orchestra International Conducting Competition.

In 2002 he was appointed chief conductor of the Castile and León Symphony Orchestra and the following year he combined this role with a shared directorship at the National Symphony Orchestra of Colombia. In 2009, Posada left his post at the Castile and León Symphony Orchestra and was replaced by Lionel Bringuier.

Discography
His recordings include a disc devoted to music by Antonio José Martínez Palacios (Sinfonía castellana, Evocaciones, El mozo de mulas) in Naxos' Spanish Classics series.

References

1960 births
Living people
21st-century conductors (music)
Colombian conductors (music)
Musicians from Medellín